The Latvian Hockey Higher League, also known as the Optibet Hockey League since 2017 due to sponsorship by Optibet, is the top tier league of ice hockey in Latvia currently comprising seven teams. Previously it was also known as the Latvian Open Hockey Championships (Latvijas atklātais čempionāts hokejā) and the Samsung Premier League (Samsung Premjerlīga) from 2006 to 2008. The league was established in 1931.

HK Liepājas Metalurgs, which played in the league between 1999 and 2013, has been the most successful team of the tournament, having won seven titles.

Several former National Hockey League players have played in the league, including Latvians Kaspars Astašenko, Helmuts Balderis, Oskars Bārtulis, Viktors Ignatjevs, Artūrs Irbe, Aleksandrs Kerčs, Kārlis Skrastiņš, Jānis Sprukts as well as imports Darby Hendrickson, Konstantin Pushkaryov, Rob Schremp.

A number of Latvian players have played in the league before making their National Hockey League debut: Kaspars Astašenko, Oskars Bārtulis, Kaspars Daugaviņš, Kristers Gudļevskis, Raitis Ivanāns, Mārtiņš Karsums, Aleksandrs Kerčs, Matīss Kivlenieks, Artūrs Kulda, Kārlis Skrastiņš, Pēteris Skudra, Jānis Sprukts, Artūrs Šilovs

Teams

Teams in 2022–23

Notable previous teams
Previous teams that have won a title or played at least five seasons in the competition, winning at least one medal.

League champions 

 2021–22 – HK Zemgale/LLU
 2020–21 – HK Olimp/Venta 2002
 2019–20 – not finished
 2018–19 – HK Mogo
 2017–18 – HK Kurbads
 2016–17 – HK Kurbads
 2015–16 – HK Liepāja
 2014–15 – HK Mogo
 2013–14 – HS Rīga/Prizma
 2012–13 – HK SMScredit.lv
 2011–12 – Liepājas Metalurgs
 2010–11 – Liepājas Metalurgs
 2009–10 – Dinamo-Juniors Riga
 2008–09 – Liepājas Metalurgs
 2007–08 – Liepājas Metalurgs
 2006–07 – HK Riga 2000
 2005–06 – HK Riga 2000
 2004–05 – HK Riga 2000
 2003–04 – HK Riga 2000
 2002–03 – Liepājas Metalurgs
 2001–02 – Liepājas Metalurgs
 2000–01 – HK Riga 2000
 1999–2000 – Liepājas Metalurgs
 1998–99 – HK Nik's Brih Riga
 1997–98 – HK Nik's Brih Riga
 1996–97 – LB/Essamika
 1995–96 – Alianse Riga
 1994–95 – HK Nik's Brih Riga
 1993–94 – HK Pārdaugava Rīga
 1992–93 – HK Pārdaugava Rīga
 1991–92 – HK Sāga Ķekava Riga
 1943–91 – not played
 1942–43 – not finished
 1941–42 – US Rīga
 1940–41 – Dinamo Rīga
 1939–40 – US Rīga
 1938–39 – ASK Rīga
 1937–38 – ASK Rīga
 1936–37 – US Rīga
 1935–36 – ASK Rīga
 1934–35 – ASK Rīga
 1933–34 – ASK Rīga
 1932–33 – Unions Rīga
 1931–32 – Unions Rīga

Titles by team

References

External links 
Official league homepage
Latvian league news and stats from Eurohockey
Latvian league stats from Elite Prospects

Top tier ice hockey leagues in Europe
 
1